Japan competed at the 2016 Winter Youth Olympics in Lillehammer, Norway from 12 to 21 February 2016.

Medalists

|  style="text-align:left; width:78%; vertical-align:top;"|

Medalists in mixed NOCs events

|  style="text-align:left; width:22%; vertical-align:top;"|

Alpine skiing

Boys

Girls

Parallel mixed team

Cross-country skiing

Boys

Girls

Curling

Mixed team

Team
Kosuke Aita
Kota Ito
Yako Matsuzawa
Honoka Sasaki

Round Robin

Draw 1

Draw 2

Draw 3

Draw 4

Draw 5

Draw 6

Draw 7

Mixed doubles

Figure skating

Singles

Mixed NOC team trophy

Ice hockey

Nordic combined 

Individual

Nordic mixed team

Skeleton

Ski jumping 

Individual

Team

Short track speed skating

Boys

Girls

Mixed team relay

Qualification Legend: FA=Final A (medal); FB=Final B (non-medal); FC=Final C (non-medal); FD=Final D (non-medal); SA/B=Semifinals A/B; SC/D=Semifinals C/D; ADV=Advanced to Next Round; PEN=Penalized

Snowboarding

Halfpipe

Snowboard cross

Snowboard and ski cross relay

Qualification legend: FA – Qualify to medal round; FB – Qualify to consolation round

Speed skating

Boys

Girls

Mixed team sprint

See also
Japan at the 2016 Summer Olympics

References

2016 in Japanese sport
Nations at the 2016 Winter Youth Olympics
Japan at the Youth Olympics